Zhang Kangkang(born as Zhang Kangmei, July 3, 1950, Hangzhou) is a Chinese female writer.

Background
Zhang was born into a family of Communist intellectuals. Her first name Kang-Kang means "resistance-resistance." She belongs to a generation affected by the Chinese Cultural Revolution.

Kangkang was among the few young people sent to the remote countryside to be "re-educated by the poor and lower-middle class peasants." Her family was regarded as "peasants of a new type with a socialist consciousness."

At the age of 19, Kangkang was sent to the Great Northern Wilderness deep in Manchuria, where she faced a life marked by deprivation and abuse by the party cadres assigned to re-educate the new arrivals.

She returned to the city eight years later after the death of Mao Zedong and was allowed to resume her studies. In 1979, Kangkang published her first work, The Right to Love. The book reflects on freedom and resistance against an oppressor.

She is married to a fellow writer Jiang Rong, known for his 2004 novel Wolf Totem.

Works
 The Boundary Line (1975)
 The Right to Love (1979)
 Summer (1981)
 The Pale Mists of Dawn (1980)
 Aurora Borealis (1981)
 The Wasted Years (Translated in Seven Contemporary Chinese Women Writers)
 Selected Works about Educated Youth. (Includes stories 'The Peony Garden', 'Cruelty' and 'Sandstorm')
 The Tolling of a Distant Bell (Translated by Daniel Bryant in Bulletin of Concerned Asian Scholars 16.3 (1984): 44-51, and Contemporary Chinese Literature (see below): 98-105)
 Northern Lights (Chapter 7 translated by Daniel Bryant in Chinese Literature, Winter 1988, pp. 92–102.)
 The Invisible Companion (Translated by Daniel Bryant. Beijing: New World Press, 1996.)
 The Peony Garden (Translated by Daniel Bryant, Renditions 58 (2002): 127-39.)

References

Further reading
 Richard King (ed. 2003) Living With Their Past: Post-Urban Youth Fiction. Hong Kong: Renditions Paperbacks, Research Center for Translation, Chinese University of Hong Kong. 2003. 
 Daniel Bryant (1989) Making it Happen: Aspects of Narrative Method in Zhang Kangkang’s ‘Northern Lights’. In Modern Chinese Women Writers: Critical Appraisals, ed. Michael Duke, Armonk, N.Y.: M.E. Sharpe, 1989, pp. 112–34.
 Contemporary Chinese Literature: an Anthology of Post-Mao Fiction and Poetry, ed. Michael Duke, Armonk: M. E. Sharpe, 1985

External links
 Profile on china.org.cn
 Brief profile on renditions.org
 Excerpts from 'Cruelty' (transl. Richard King)

1950 births
Living people
Chinese women writers
Chinese children's writers
Chinese women short story writers
Writers from Hangzhou
Chinese women children's writers
21st-century Chinese writers
Chinese women novelists